The Shire of Nathalia was a local government area on the Murray River in the Goulburn Valley region, about  north of Melbourne, the state capital of Victoria, Australia.

History

Nathalia was once part of the vast Echuca Road District, which was formed in 1864 and became a shire from 1871. It extended along the south bank of the Murray River, from Mount Hope Creek in the west, to the Ovens River in the east.

It was first incorporated in its own right as the Shire of Shepparton on 30 May 1879. The southeastern section containing Shepparton itself split away on 18 September 1884, and was initially known as the Shire of South Shepparton. On 11 April 1885, the Shire of Shepparton was renamed Numurkah, and South Shepparton was renamed Shepparton some months later. On 30 May 1892, Numurkah annexed the Moira Ward of Echuca, setting the shire's southwestern boundary at the Goulburn River.

Some acrimony developed between the towns of Nathalia and Numurkah, which ended in 1957, with the shire being renamed Nathalia, and the Shire of Numurkah severing and was incorporated on 30 May 1957. The shire, with an estimated population of 3,650 in 1958, did not grow significantly between then and its amalgamation.

On 18 November 1994, the Shire of Nathalia was abolished, and along with the Shires of Cobram, Numurkah, Tungamah and Yarrawonga, was merged into the newly created Shire of Moira.

Wards

Nathalia was divided into four ridings on 30 May 1957, each of which elected three councillors:
 Broken Riding
 Goulburn Riding
 Murray Riding
 Yalca Riding

Towns and localities
 Barmah
 Kaarimba
 Kotupna
 Nathalia*
 Picola
 Waaia
 Yalca
 Yielima

* Council seat.

Population

* Estimate in the 1958 Victorian Year Book.
+ The combined population for Numurkah and Nathalia in 1958 is given as 8,850.

References

External links
 Victorian Places - Nathalia and Nathalia Shire

Nathalia